Chad Erskine (born 8 January 1980 in Pietermaritzburg) is an American former rugby union scrum-half. He was a member of the United States national rugby union team and participated with the squad at the 2007 Rugby World Cup. He is currently a Rugby Color Commentator and Analysts for PRO Rugby.

References

1980 births
Living people
Rugby union scrum-halves
American rugby union players
United States international rugby union players
Alumni of Maritzburg College